Mikhail Khazbiyevich Bakayev (born 5 August 1987) is a Russian professional footballer who plays as a defensive midfielder for Alania-2 Vladikavkaz.

Career

Club
He made his professional debut in the Russian Second Division in 2003 for FC Avtodor Vladikavkaz.

He made his Russian Premier League debut for FC Anzhi Makhachkala on 13 March 2010 in a game against PFC Spartak Nalchik.

On 1 August 2011, Bakayev re-signed for Alania Vladikavkaz after two and a half years with Anzhi Makhachkala.

In March 2014, Bakayev signed a three-year contract with FC Kairat of the Kazakhstan Premier League. In October 2014, Bakayev, along with Dmitri Khomich, Zaurbek Pliyev, Aleksandr Kislitsyn and Samat Smakov, was banned from training with FC Kairat by the club. On 28 October 2016, Bakayev extended his contract with Kairat until 16 December 2019. On 29 August 2017, Kairat announced that Bakayev had left the club to join Anzhi Makhachkala, with Anzhi announcing the signing the following day.

On 2 July 2018, FC Orenburg announced the signing of Bakayev.

On 14 February 2020, Bakayev left Shinnik Yaroslavl by mutual consent.

On 26 February 2020, FC Shakhter Karagandy announced the signing of Bakayev. On 30 December 2021, Bakayev left Shakhter Karagandy after his contract expired.

International
In August 2008, Bakayev was called up to the Russia U21 squad.

Personal life
His older brother Eduard Bakayev was also a professional footballer.

Career statistics

Honours

Club
FC Kairat
 Kazakhstan Cup (2): 2014, 2015
 Kazakhstan Super Cup (1): 2016

References

External links
 
 Profile at FNL official site
 Match statistics at RFU site

1987 births
People from Tskhinvali
Living people
Russian footballers
Russia under-21 international footballers
Association football midfielders
FC Spartak Vladikavkaz players
FC Anzhi Makhachkala players
FC Kairat players
FC Orenburg players
FC Shinnik Yaroslavl players
FC Shakhter Karagandy players
Russian Premier League players
Russian First League players
Kazakhstan Premier League players
Russian expatriate footballers
Expatriate footballers in Kazakhstan
Russian expatriate sportspeople in Kazakhstan